This is the filmography for American television personality Sherri Shepherd.

Film

Television

Comedy Special

Theatre

References 

Actress filmographies
American filmographies